The 2016–17 Georgetown Hoyas women's basketball team represented Georgetown University in the 2016–17 college basketball season. The Hoyas, led by third year head coach Natasha Adair, were members of the Big East Conference, and played their home games at the McDonough Gymnasium. They finished the season 17–13, 9–9 in Big East play to finish in sixth place. They lost in the quarterfinals of the Big East women's tournament to Marquette. They were invited to the WNIT where they lost to Fordham in the first round.

Roster

Schedule

|-
!colspan=9 style="background:#002147; color:#8D817B;"| Non-conference regular season

|-
!colspan=9 style="background:#002147; color:#8D817B;"| Non-conference regular season

|-
!colspan=9 style="background:#002147; color:#8D817B;"| Big East Women's Tournament

|-
!colspan=9 style="background:#002147; color:#8D817B;"| WNIT

Rankings
2016–17 NCAA Division I women's basketball rankings

See also
2016–17 Georgetown Hoyas men's basketball team

References

Georgetown
Georgetown Hoyas women's basketball seasons
2017 Women's National Invitation Tournament participants